Banksia drummondii, commonly known as Drummond's dryandra, is a species of shrub that is endemic to Western Australia. It has pinnatifid to pinnatisect leaves, heads of up to one hundred cream-coloured, red and yellow flowers and glabrous fruit.

Description
Banksia drummondii is a shrub that typically grows to a height of  but does not form a lignotuber. The leaves are covered with rust-coloured, woolly hairs at first and have between 10 and 22 triangular to oblong lobes on each side. The upper side is bluish green and the veins on the lower side are prominent.

Taxonomy and naming
This species was first formally described in 1848 by Carl Meissner who gave it the name Dryandra drummondii and published the description in Lehmann's Plantae Preissianae from specimens collected near the Swan River Colony by James Drummond. The specific epithet (drummondii) honours the collector of the type specimens.

In 1996, Alex George described three subspecies:

In 2007, Austin Mast and Kevin Thiele transferred all Dryandra species to Banksia and Dryandra drummondii was renamed Banksia drummondii.

The changed names of the subspecies are as follows and are accepted at the Australian Plant Census:
 Banksia drummondii subsp. drummondii;
 Banksia drummondii subsp. hiemalis;
 Banksia drummondii subsp. macrorufa.

Distribution and habitat
Subspecies drummondii occurs in the Stirling Range, extending to South Stirling and Kendenup and Ongerup, growing in mallee-kwongan. Subspecies hiemalis grows in forest and woodland between New Norcia and Wickepin. Subspecies macrorufa is only known from near Nyabing where it grows in low kwongan.

Ecology
An assessment of the potential impact of climate change on this species found that its range is likely to contract by between 50% and 80% by 2080, depending on the severity of the change.

Conservation status
Subspecies macrorufa is classified as "Priority Two" by the Western Australian Government Department of Parks and Wildlife meaning that it is poorly known and from only one or a few locations, but the other two subspecies are classified as "not threatened".

References

drummondii
Endemic flora of Western Australia
Eudicots of Western Australia
Plants described in 1848
Taxa named by Kevin Thiele